|}

The Whitsun Cup is a flat handicap horse race in Great Britain open to horses aged four years or older. It is run at Sandown Park over a distance of 1 mile (1,609 metres), and it is scheduled to take place each year at the end of May.

Winners since 1988

See also 
Horse racing in Great Britain
List of British flat horse races

References

 Paris-Turf:
Racing Post
, 

Flat races in Great Britain
Sandown Park Racecourse
Open mile category horse races